Management in Education (MiE) is a quarterly, peer-reviewed academic journal in the field of educational leadership and management. The journal's editor-in-chief is Jacqueline Baxter, senior lecturer at The Open University. It was established in 1987 and is currently published by SAGE Publications on behalf of the British Educational Leadership, Management & Administration Society.

The editorial advisory board comprises academics and practitioners from the field of education. MiE provides a forum for debate and discussion covering all aspects of educational management. Our peer review policy helps to enhance the range and quality of the articles accepted supporting those new to publication and those who are more experienced authors. MIE is a quarterly international journal that is offered free to members of the Society.

The journal publishes a range of articles which includes: traditional research articles, opinion pieces, interviews with leading practitioners and academics and news and views about the various special interest groups within BELMAS. It invites contributions by experienced and newer researchers and practitioners.

Abstracting and indexing 
Management in Education is abstracted and indexed in:
 Australian Education Index
 British Education Index
 Scopus
 ZETOC

External links 
 
 British Educational Leadership, Management & Administration Society

SAGE Publishing academic journals
English-language journals
Education journals
Business and management journals
Publications established in 1987
Quarterly journals